Adnan Catic may refer to:

 Felix Sturm (Adnan Ćatić, born 1979), German-Bosnian professional boxer
 Adnan Catic (footballer) (born 2000), Swedish footballer